is a Japanese professional shogi player ranked 7-dan.

Early life
Hirafuji was born in Toyonaka, Osaka on October 15, 1963. He entered the Japan Shogi Association's apprentice school as student of shogi professional  in 1980. He was promoted to 1-dan in 1983 and obtained full professional status and the rank of 4-dan in April 1991.

Promotion history
Hirafuji's promotion history is as follows:

 6-kyū: 1980
 1-dan: 1983
 4-dan: April 1, 1991
 5-dan: March 1, 1996
 6-dan: November 5, 2002
 7-dan: October 25, 2011

References

External links
ShogiHub: Professional Player Info · Hirafuji, Shingo

Japanese shogi players
Living people
Professional shogi players from Osaka Prefecture
1963 births
People from Toyonaka, Osaka
Professional shogi players